Štěch is Czech and Slovak surname, which is derived from the given name Štepán or Štefan, variants of Stephen. The name may refer to:

Andrzej Stech (1635–1697), Polish painter
Karel Štěch (1908–1982), Czech artist
Marek Štěch (born 1990), Czech footballer
Milan Štěch (born 1953), Czech politician

References

Czech-language surnames
Slovak-language surnames